Qutan (also Romanized as Qūţān) is a village in Zangebar Rural District, in the Central District of Poldasht County, West Azerbaijan Province, Iran. At the 2006 census, its population was 269, in 59 families.

Name 
According to Vladimir Minorsky, the name "Qutan" is derived from either the Turkic word qotan, meaning "an enclosure for sheep", or from the Mongolian word qutan, referring to the pelican.

References 

Populated places in Poldasht County